Harrison Norris Jr. (born August 22, 1966), is an American Gulf War U.S. Army veteran, retired professional wrestler and former 2001 Toughman heavyweight champion, best known by his ring name Hardbody Harrison and sometimes Hardbody Harris. In 2008, he was sentenced to life in prison for his part in a sex trafficking and forced labor ring.

Early life Career 
Harrison graduated from high school in Pensacola, Florida, after which he enlisted in the United States Army and saw action in Operation Desert Shield and Operation Desert Storm. He served as a platoon and motor sergeant, and received an honorable discharge in 1995.

Professional wrestling Career 
He then trained at the WCW Power Plant and later in 1995, debuted in World Championship Wrestling as a jobber. He appeared on WCW Monday Nitro as well as 1997's Starrcade. In 2000, he was a party to a multi-plaintiff lawsuit filed by Sonny Onoo, Bobby Walker and several other former WCW talents against former parent company AOL Time Warner alleging racial discrimination; the suit was settled out of court for which Harrison received a sizeable payout.

In 2000, Harrison also appeared in Toughman competitions which broadcast from 1999 to 2001 on FX show Toughman. In 2000, he was the show's heavyweight champion.

In March 2001, WCW was bought by the World Wrestling Federation and Harrison's contract was not retained.

Criminal charges 
On August 18, 2004, Harrison was arrested by the Smyrna Police Department in Smyrna, Georgia on three counts of false imprisonment and after spending one night in jail, he was released on a $55,000 bond the next day.

On August 23, 2005, FBI agents served a search warrant and raided Harrison's two homes in Bartow County, Georgia. On October 18, 2005, he was arrested by the FBI on a nine count federal indictment for false imprisonment and trafficking women for commercial sex acts. On November 22, 2007, he was found guilty and convicted by a federal jury in Atlanta, Georgia on charges related to keeping eight women as sex slaves. During proceedings, for which he served as his own attorney, Harrison contended the women lived in his homes with his wife and child because they wanted to train as professional wrestlers, and that he had helped them quit drugs. Witnesses contended that Harrison manipulated the women psychologically, forced them to have sex with him, and required them to participate in large sex orgies involving up to eight men at a single time. The victims contended that Harrison's rigid training regimen, consisting of a wide variety of exercises and household chores, and having to memorize a series of "commandments" was designed to make them attractive prostitutes, and that he pimped them out to nightclubs, trailer parks, apartments, hotels, in the back of Norris’ truck, and in other locations in North Carolina and northern Georgia until a few of the women went to the police. Failure to complete chores or breaking rules required the women to pay money to Harrison, creating a never-ending debt cycle.

After conviction, Harrison was sentenced to life in prison on April 1, 2008.

References

External links 

1966 births
Living people
21st-century American criminals
African-American male professional wrestlers
American male professional wrestlers
United States Army personnel of the Gulf War
American prisoners sentenced to life imprisonment
Criminals from Florida
Criminals from Georgia (U.S. state)
Professional wrestlers from Tennessee
United States Army soldiers
20th-century African-American sportspeople
21st-century African-American people
People convicted of sex trafficking